is a Japanese professional baseball pitcher for the Saitama Seibu Lions in Japan's Nippon Professional Baseball.

External links

NPB stats

1986 births
Living people
Baseball people from Saitama Prefecture
Japanese baseball players
Nippon Professional Baseball pitchers
Hanshin Tigers players
Saitama Seibu Lions players
Asian Games medalists in baseball
Baseball players at the 2010 Asian Games
Medalists at the 2010 Asian Games
Asian Games bronze medalists for Japan
21st-century Japanese people